William J. Cleary (May 14, 1870 – 1952) was a politician from the U.S. state of Michigan. From 1943 to 1950 he was member of the Michigan State House of Representatives for the second house district from Berrien County. Cleary was born of Irish ancestry, near Greenfield, Indiana, in Hancock County. His profession was civil engineer and he lived in Benton Harbor.

External links
The Political Graveyard

1870 births
1952 deaths
Members of the Michigan House of Representatives
People from Hancock County, Indiana
People from Benton Harbor, Michigan